Beijing Organizing Committee may refer to:

Beijing Organizing Committee for the Olympic Games, for the 2008 Summer Olympics
Beijing Organising Committee for the 2022 Olympic and Paralympic Winter Games